Leacock Regional Park, located in Casula, approx. 40 km south-west of Sydney, is a patch of open green space which provides views of Holsworthy bushland from the ridge line.

The Park is a dog-friendly park, and has many walking tracks along the Georges River, which link it with other facilities such as the Casula Powerhouse Arts Centre.

References

 

Regional parks in New South Wales